Boris Savchuk (19 August 1943 – 1996) was a Ukrainian sprinter. He competed in the men's 200 metres at the 1964 Summer Olympics representing the Soviet Union.

References

External links
 

1943 births
1996 deaths
Athletes (track and field) at the 1964 Summer Olympics
Ukrainian male sprinters
Olympic athletes of the Soviet Union
Place of birth missing
Universiade silver medalists for the Soviet Union
Universiade medalists in athletics (track and field)
Medalists at the 1970 Summer Universiade
Soviet male sprinters